Joan W. Welsh (born June 17, 1940) is an American politician. She served in the Maine House of Representatives for the 94th District, representing Camden, Rockport, and Islesboro from 2008 until 2016. She is a member of the Democratic Party. District 94 used to be District 46, until the rezoning of districts came along shortly after 2012.

 Representative of Maine's 94th District (Camden, Rockport, and Islesboro)
 House Chair of the Joint Standing Committee on Environment and Natural Resources

Previous work 

 Welsh was the CEO and President of Hurricane Island Outward Bound
 Former director of student and academic affairs Rockport College (in Maine)
 Served as the deputy director of the Natural Resources Council of Maine

Welsh has served, and does serve on many other non-profit organizations mainly in the midcoast area of Maine.

Education 
Joan Welsh attended Pomona College and  University of Colorado. She has a bachelor's degree in English.

References

External links 
Representative Joan W. Welsh - Maine House of Representatives

1940 births
Living people
Democratic Party members of the Maine House of Representatives
Politicians from Boulder, Colorado
People from Fresno, California
People from Rockport, Maine
University of Colorado alumni
Women state legislators in Maine
21st-century American politicians
21st-century American women politicians
Pomona College alumni